Emily Katherine Bell Tippetts (March 11, 1865 – December 20, 1950) was an American businesswoman and clubwoman based in St. Petersburg, Florida. She was one of the first women to run for a seat in the Florida legislature, in 1922. As the founder and president of the St. Petersburg chapter of the National Audubon Society for over 30 years, and in various statewide and national leadership positions with women's clubs, Tippetts helped establish protective legislation and bird sanctuaries throughout Florida.

Early life 
Emily Katherine Bell was born in Marion Station, Maryland, the daughter of Nathaniel Thomas Bell and Julia Frances Hawkes Bell. Her mother was a Mayflower descendant.

Career

Audubon Society and conservation work 
Tippetts moved to Florida in 1902, one of the city's "pioneers" and proprietor of the Belmont Hotel. She founded the St. Petersburg chapter of the National Audubon Society in 1909, holding the first meeting in her hotel, and was the chapter's president for over 30 years, until she retired from the past in 1940. She was also the first woman president of the Florida Audubon Society, serving from 1920 to 1924. She contributed to the establishment of wildlife sanctuaries in Florida, and the passage of the Migratory Bird Act of 1913. She successfully petitioned the state to protect the American robin, and holly plants, and to form the Florida Fish and Game Commission. In 1915, under her pressure, St. Petersburg became the second known city in the world to tax cat owners, an effort to control the hazards of stray and abandoned cats. "Mrs. Tippetts said that she would rather have a tree named for her, than anything else, except perhaps her child and grandchild," according to a 1928 account.  She was chair of the Nature Study and Wildlife Refuges committee (1924 to 1928) and chair of the Division of Conservation (1928 to 1932) of the General Federation of Women's Clubs.

Other leadership roles 
During World War I, Tippetts raised money as city chair of the War Savings Stamp campaign. In 1922, Tippetts became one of the first two women to run for a seat in the Florida legislature. She was vice president of the American Forestry Association, and president of the Florida Federation of Women's Clubs from 1926 to 1928. She worked with her friend and Florida first lady May Mann Jennings on some federation projects, and in leadership of the Florida Legislative Council. She chaired the Florida Chamber of Commerce. She was vice president of the Crippled Children's Guild, and in that role helped to found a children's hospital in 1926. She also organized the city's first Boy Scout troop and named a nearby lake.

Writing 
Under the pen-name "Jerome Cable", Tippetts published a novel, Prince Arengzeba: A Romance of Lake George (1892). She later wrote a pamphlet, Birds of the States (1932) about state birds, for schools and women's study groups. In 1941, she was honored by the St. Petersburg branch of the National League of American Pen Women.

Personal life 
Bell married newspaperman William Henry Tippetts in 1890, and moved to Florida for his health in 1902; he died in 1909. They had three sons and a daughter. Katherine Bell Tippetts died in 1950, aged 85 years, in St. Petersburg. There is a park in St. Petersburg named in her memory.

References 

1865 births
1950 deaths
People from St. Petersburg, Florida
American conservationists
American women writers
American women in World War I
20th-century American people